Azanza lampas is an Asian shrub in the family Malvaceae and tribe Gossypieae; its native range is tropical and subtropical Asia.  It has yellow flowers, grows up to 3 metres and in Vietnam it is called Tra nhỏ.

Uses
Its roots and fruits are traditionally used to treat gonorrhea and syphilis. The paste made from its roots is used by the Korku tribe of Maharashtra and Nepal to cure jaundice.

References

External links

 Medicinal properties
 Description

lampas
Flora of tropical Asia
Pantropical flora
Taxa named by Antonio José Cavanilles